The 2006–07 Romanian Hockey League season was the 77th season of the Romanian Hockey League. Six teams participated in the league, and SC Miercurea Ciuc won the championship.

First round

Final round

Playoffs

Final
SC Miercurea Ciuc - CSA Steaua Bucuresti 4-2, 5-6, 3-1, 3-2, 5-4

3rd place
HC Miercurea Ciuc - Progym Gheorgheni 4-7, 8-3, 5-2, 9-4

5th place
Sportul Studențesc Bucharest - CSM Dunărea Galați 3-2, 5-2

External links
Season on hockeyarchives.info

Romanian Hockey League seasons
Romanian
Rom